An enumerative definition of a concept or term is a special type of extensional definition that gives an explicit and exhaustive listing of all the objects that fall under the concept or term in question.  Enumerative definitions are only possible for finite sets and only practical for relatively small sets.

An example of an enumerative definition for the set
 extant monotreme species
(for which the intensional definition is species of currently-living mammals that lay eggs) would be
 platypuses
 echidnae:
 short-beaked echidna
 long-beaked echidnae:
 Sir David's long-beaked echidna
 eastern long-beaked echidna
 western long-beaked echidna

See also
 Definition
 Extension
 Extensional definition
 Set notation
 Enumeration

Logic
Definition